State elections were held in South Australia on 25 November 1989. All 47 seats in the South Australian House of Assembly were up for election. The incumbent Australian Labor Party led by Premier of South Australia John Bannon defeated the Liberal Party of Australia led by Leader of the Opposition John Olsen. Labor won 22 out of 47 seats, and secured a majority of 24 with the support of two Independent Labor members.

Background
Parliamentary elections for both houses of the Parliament of South Australia were held in South Australia in 1989. John Bannon's Labor government had initially presided over an economic boom, but at the time of the election the economy had slowed due to the late 1980s recession. The Liberals' campaign accused Bannon of inaction during the poor economic conditions, capitalising on the fact that he was national president of Australian Labor Party at the time.

Outcome
The Liberals gained five seats (Adelaide, Bright, Fisher, Hayward and Newland), but Labor held power with of the support of the two "independent Labor" members.

The John Olsen-led Liberal Party of Australia failed to win office despite gaining 52 percent of the two-party vote.

It was only the second time that a Labor government in South Australia had been re-elected for a third term, however it would be the first eleven-year-incumbent Labor government.

In the South Australian Legislative Council, the numbers were unchanged (Labor 10, Liberal 10, Australian Democrats 2). Thus the Democrats retained sole balance of power. They had held sole balance of power since 1985, and would continue to hold it until 1997.

Aftermath

Before the election, the Liberal Party made allegations of a Labor 'gerrymander', due to the perceived unfair state of the electoral boundaries. While Labor had not instituted any type of imbalanced electoral legislation, it had nonetheless not issued a redistribution since 1983 (which it was not required to do, because redistributions were only required after every third election). So while the electoral districts were equal within the required 10 percent tolerances when they were drawn in 1983, population shifts had increased that imbalance substantially. Because of this, a 1991 state referendum made redistributions mandatory by the Electoral Commission of South Australia after each election, and included a 'fairness clause' where the commission should redraw boundaries with the objective that the party which receives over 50 percent of the statewide two-party vote at the forthcoming election should win the two-party vote in a majority of seats.

Olsen was replaced as Liberal leader by Dale Baker in 1990. Baker resigned as leader in 1992 without contesting an election, and the subsequent leadership ballot was won by Dean Brown, ahead of Olsen and Jennifer Cashmore.

The parliament had three by-elections (1990 Custance by-election, the 1992 Alexandra by-election and the 1992 Kavel by-election), but all were retained by the Liberal party, so resulted in no change in the numbers in parliament.

Independent Labor Martyn Evans joined the ALP in 1993 and stood at the 1993 election as an endorsed ALP candidate.

Key dates
 Issue of writ: 29 October 1989
 Close of electoral rolls: 6 November 1989
 Close of nominations: Friday 10 November 1989, at noon
 Polling day: 25 November 1989
 Return of writ: On or before 18 December 1989

Results

House of Assembly

 

|}

Seats changing hands

 Stan Evans was elected at the 1985 election as an Independent. He joined the Liberal Party shortly afterward and retained the seat of Davenport as a Liberal.

Legislative Council

|}

Post-election pendulum

See also
 Candidates of the South Australian state election, 1989
 Results of the South Australian state election, 1989 (House of Assembly)
 Results of the 1989 South Australian state election (Legislative Council)
 Members of the South Australian House of Assembly, 1989-1993
 Members of the South Australian Legislative Council, 1989-1993

References

History of South Australian elections 1857–2006, volume 1: ECSA
Historical lower house results
Historical upper house results
State and federal election results  in Australia since 1890

External links
South Australian Elections 1989: Parliament of Australia Research Library paper, including maps

Elections in South Australia
1989 elections in Australia
1980s in South Australia
November 1989 events in Australia